Ålidhöjd is a residential area in Umeå, Sweden.

External links
Ålidhöjd at Umeå Municipality

Umeå